Cristian Badilla (born 11 July 1978) is a Costa Rican former footballer. He played in 15 matches for the Costa Rica national football team from 2004 to 2005. He was also part of Costa Rica's squad for the 2004 Copa América tournament.

References

External links
 
 

1978 births
Living people
Costa Rican footballers
Costa Rica international footballers
Place of birth missing (living people)
Association football midfielders
C.S. Herediano footballers
Municipal Pérez Zeledón footballers
C.F. Universidad de Costa Rica footballers